In electronics, prototyping means building an actual circuit to a theoretical design to verify that it works, and to provide a physical platform for debugging it if it does not. The prototype is often constructed using techniques such as wire wrapping or using a breadboard, stripboard or perfboard, with the result being a circuit that is electrically identical to the design but not physically identical to the final product.

Open-source tools like Fritzing exist to document electronic prototypes (especially the breadboard-based ones) and move toward physical production. Prototyping platforms such as Arduino also simplify the task of programming and interacting with a microcontroller. The developer can choose to deploy their invention as-is using the prototyping platform, or replace it with only the microcontroller chip and the circuitry that is relevant to their product.

A technician can quickly build a prototype (and make additions and modifications) using these techniques, but for volume production it is much faster and usually cheaper to mass-produce custom printed circuit boards than to produce these other kinds of prototype boards. The proliferation of quick-turn PCB fabrication and assembly companies has enabled the concepts of rapid prototyping to be applied to electronic circuit design. It is now possible, even with the smallest passive components and largest fine-pitch packages, to have boards fabricated, assembled, and even tested in a matter of days.

Boards

Breadboard

Perfboard

Stripboard

References

P
Prototypes